Cangas de Onís (Asturian: Cangues d'Onís "valleys of Onís") is a municipality in the eastern part of the province and autonomous community of Asturias in the northwest of Spain. The capital of the municipality is also Cangas de Onís.

More than seventy square kilometres of the conceyu form part of the Parque nacional de los Picos de Europa.

History
Within the park is the village of Covadonga, where the battle of Covadonga (about 722), the first major victory by a Christian military force in Iberia after the Islamic conquest, marks the starting-point of the Reconquista. 
Cangas de Onís is the site of the first church constructed in post-conquest Iberia, Santa Cruz de Cangas de Onís (737), built on an ancient dolmen.

A parish named Cangas de Onís is attested for the 14th century. The stone bridge across the Sella River was built in the 14th or 15th century.

Cangas de Onís was represented in the Junta General of the principality of Asturias in 1504.
Covadonga began to be developed as a pilgrimage site in the 16th century, attracting commerce.
The settlement of Cangas de Onís grew rapidly in the mid 19th century.
A meteorite fall is recorded for the year 1866.

Cangas de Onís/Cangues d'Onís was bombarded several times in the Spanish Civil War.
It served as the seat of the  Regional Council in the "pre-autonomous regime" of 1978–1981 prior to the entering into force of the 
Statute of Autonomy of the Principality of Asturias on 31 January 1982.

Vegetation
Given its varied height it has many types of plants, including many mountain shrubs, heather; oak, have and ash trees, rounded by grassland and copes.

Economy
The main economic activities of this region are agriculture and cattle rearing along with rural tourism. The nearby Covadonga Sanctuary and its surrounding lakes are one of the main tourist destinations in Asturias.

Parishes
Cangas de Onís is divided in eleven parishes:
 Abamia
 Cangas de Onís
 Con
 Covadonga
 Grazanes
 Labra
 Margolles
 La Riera
 Triongo
 Villanueva
 Zardón

The capital of the municipality is the parish of Cangas de Onís. The postal code is 33550 and is divided in several villages:

 Cañu
 Cabielles
 Cangues
 Cardes
 Celangu
 Ḥelgueres
 Llueves
 Ñarciandi
 Ñeda
 Onao
 Següencu
 Torió
 Tornín

Notable people
 Berta Piñán (born 1963), writer, politician

Gallery

References

External links 

 Guía turística 
 www.cangasdeonis.com 
  Cangas de Onís 
 Casa Rural 
 Cangas de Onís

Municipalities in Asturias
Picos de Europa